That's My Bush! was an American sitcom that aired on Comedy Central from April 4 to May 23, 2001. The show was created by Trey Parker and Matt Stone, a comedy-duo best known for creating South Park.

Despite the political overtones, the show itself was more a broad lampoon of American sitcoms, including jokes, a laugh track, and stock characters such as klutzy secretary Princess (Kristen Miller), know-it-all maid Maggie (Marcia Wallace), and supposedly helpful next door neighbor Larry (John D'Aquino).

The series was conceived in the wake of the 2000 presidential election, between George W. Bush and Al Gore. Parker and Stone were sure that Gore would win the election, and tentatively titled the show Everybody Loves Al. However, due to the controversy regarding the election's outcome, the series was pushed back. Instead, the show was then plotted around Bush at the workplace.

The show received positive reviews, with The New York Times commenting, "That's My Bush! is a satire of hero worship itself; it is the anti-West Wing and the first true post-Clinton comedy. [...] This politically astute criticism is embedded in so much hysterical humor that the series never seems weighty."

Plot
The series centers on the fictitious personal life of President George W. Bush, played by Timothy Bottoms. Carrie Quinn Dolin played Laura Bush, and Kurt Fuller played Karl Rove.

Episodes dealt (with deliberate heavy-handedness) with the topics of abortion, gun control, the war on drugs, drilling in the Arctic National Wildlife Refuge, and the death penalty. Every episode ended with George saying "One of these days, Laura, I'm gonna punch you in the face!", a parody of Jackie Gleason's line from The Honeymooners, "One of these days, POW!!! Right in the kisser!"

The show was more of a spoof of the banality of television sitcoms in general, rather than a cutting political satire. As The A.V. Club put it:

Cast
 Timothy Bottoms as President George W. Bush
 Carrie Quinn Dolin as First Lady Laura Bush
 Kurt Fuller as Deputy Chief of Staff Karl Rove
 Marcia Wallace as Maggie Hawley
 Kristen Miller as Princess Stevenson
 John D'Aquino as Larry O'Shea

Production

Development
Parker and Stone stated before the 2000 presidential election that they would create a satire about whoever won. According to their DVD commentary, they were "95% certain that Gore would win" and started developing the series under the title Everybody Loves Al. When the final election results were in limbo, production was delayed until the winner was determined. With Bush's election, the title became the entendre That's My Bush! The final episode involved Dick Cheney forcing Bush to step down, and featured an alternate title music called That's My Dick! which, later in the episode, changed to What A Dick!

Writing
The entire idea behind the series was to parody sitcoms. The premise developed into one of the U.S. President in office. Parker recalled the idea came about three months before the 2000 presidential election. The duo were "95 percent sure" that Democratic candidate Al Gore would win, and tentatively titled the show Everybody Loves Al. It was, essentially, the same show: a lovable main character, the sassy maid, the wacky neighbor. Parker said the producers did not want to make fun of politics, but instead lampoon sitcoms. The duo watched a lot of Fawlty Towers in preparation.

The duo signed a deal with Comedy Central to produce a live action sitcom, titled Family First, scheduled to debut on February 28, 2001. They threw a party the night of the election with the writers, with intentions to begin writing the following Monday and shooting the show in January 2001 with the inauguration. With the confusion of who the President would be, the show's production was pushed back. The duo wanted to write a "family sitcom", with the Bush family.

Comedy Central, however, prohibited Parker and Stone from including the Bush twins (Jenna Bush and Barbara Pierce Bush). The writers then turned the Bush twins character into Princess. "An Aborted Dinner Date" was the show's pilot episode. The episode features Felix the Fetus, which was made and operated by the Chiodo Brothers, who later worked with Parker and Stone on Team America: World Police (2004). They also created the cat Punk'kin in "The First Lady's Persqueeter". The show's producers consider the second episode aired, "A Poorly Executed Plan", the true first episode.

This was Parker and Stone's first live action production to be a part of the Writers Guild of America, West. The show's writers got a big dry-erase board and on one side, they would write down political ideas (abortion, capital punishment) and on the other side would be typical sitcom stories (frat buddies show up, trapped in a small space). They would then combine the two ideas, in what Stone described as "a Three's Company mix-up kind of thing." That's My Bush! was filmed at Sony Pictures Studios, and was the first time Parker and Stone shot a show on a production lot.

The show was not shot in front of a live audience, so as to keep control over the show and by necessity, thanks to various shots they would be unable to do in a normal show. They had built several rooms from the White House in their studio (bedroom, dining room) and were allowed "one new, rotating set" per week.

Parker described the sets as "amazing," and they were in fact packaged up after the show's run and sent to other White House-related productions. The show's producers gained inspiration by going on a private tour of the White House thanks to Anne Garefino, executive producer, who once worked at the White House for PBS. A White House usher showed the producers various rooms not allowed on normal tours, which allowed them to detail each set effectively.

Casting was relatively simple; Parker and Stone came across a photo of Timothy Bottoms in Variety for a play he was doing in Santa Barbara. Parker and Stone called him in, and they found he was "perfect" for the role. The plan was not to viciously "rip on" Bush or make him out to be a monster; in accordance with sitcom stereotypes, Bush was made a sweet and lovable oaf. Kurt Fuller was the last actor to be cast in the show. Jeff Melman was the director for each episode. This was the first time Trey Parker was only writing, not directing.

Each episode was shot in two days. The weeks were spent writing and getting ready while the cast rehearsed. Like South Park, in which Parker would be able to write a scene and see it animated a short time later, he and Stone could walk to rehearsals and see the cast rehearsing their script. Each episode opened with a cold open, with a "cheesy" joke that segued into the theme song. The duo recalled that, with stupid titles, these scenes were often the hardest to write.

The episode "SDI-Aye-AYE!" features the first utterance of the word "Lemmiwinks", which Parker and the writers intended to be a parody of The Lord of the Rings. The word was later famously used in the South Park episode "The Death Camp of Tolerance". The show's first episode set a Comedy Central ratings record (at the time) for highest debut with over 2.9 million viewers tuning in; however, ratings dropped after this, with an average of 1.7 million viewers.

During the production of "Fare Thee Welfare", the show's series finale, the producers knew the show would end as it would be very expensive. For example, for the episode "Eenie Meenie Miney Murder", Parker and Stone used a live bear, an animatronic bear, an actor in a bear suit, and a puppet bear, which ended up breaking their budget. Although the show received a fair amount of publicity and critical notice, according to Stone and Parker, the cost per episode was too high, "about $1 million an episode."

Comedy Central officially cancelled the series in August 2001, as a cost-cutting move; Stone was quoted as saying "A super-expensive show on a small cable network...the economics of it were just not going to work." Comedy Central continued the show in reruns, considering it a creative and critical success. Parker believed the show would not have survived after the September 11 attacks anyway, and Stone agreed, saying the show would not "play well." There was talk of a spin-off feature film for the series entitled George W. Bush and the Secret of the Glass Tiger. The concept behind the film extended the bait and switch gag of the show: it would have to do with a Chinese invasion foiled by the President. Parker and Stone intended to work on it during the summer of 2002.

Parker recalls That's My Bush! "a great time in our lives," and "the most fun we've had in our careers." That's My Bush! has had an effect on the structure of South Park: prior to 2001, each South Park episode was broken up into four acts. While producing That's My Bush!, Parker and Stone found the three act structure provided a better story, and South Park has continued to use it in recent years. Stone called the show one of the most pleasant experiences in his life.

Bottoms went on to portray George W. Bush in two later films: in a comedic context in Crocodile Hunter: Collision Course, and in a serious context in the television movie DC 9/11: Time of Crisis.

Episodes

Home media
A DVD set containing the entire series, plus commentaries by cast and crew, titled That's My Bush! The Definitive Collection, was released in North America on October 24, 2006.

See also

 Lil' Bush – animated series satirizing Bush, also on Comedy Central
 Cory in the House – a series where John D'Aquino plays the president.
 1600 Penn
 The President Show – Another Comedy Central sitcom focusing on The President in office.
 Our Cartoon President - An animated series about president Donald Trump.

Notes

External links
 
 

2000s American political comedy television series
2000s American parody television series
2000s American satirical television series
2000s American sitcoms
2001 American television series debuts
2001 American television series endings
Comedy Central original programming
Cultural depictions of George W. Bush
English-language television shows
Political satirical television series
Parodies of television shows
Television series created by Trey Parker
Television series created by Matt Stone
Television shows set in Washington, D.C.
Television shows filmed in Los Angeles
White House in fiction
Cultural depictions of Dick Cheney
Television series about George W. Bush